Events from the year 2013 in Michigan.

Office holders

State office holders

 Governor of Michigan: Rick Snyder (Republican)
 Lieutenant Governor of Michigan: Brian Calley (Republican) 
 Michigan Attorney General: Bill Schuette (Republican)
 Michigan Secretary of State: Ruth Johnson (Republican)
 Speaker of the Michigan House of Representatives: Jase Bolger (Republican)
 Majority Leader of the Michigan Senate: Randy Richardville (Republican)
 Chief Justice, Michigan Supreme Court: Robert P. Young Jr.

Mayors of major cities
 Mayor of Detroit: Dave Bing (Democrat)
 Mayor of Grand Rapids: George Heartwell
 Mayor of Warren, Michigan: James R. Fouts
 Mayor of Ann Arbor: John Hieftje (Democrat)
 Mayor of Lansing: Virgil Bernero
 Mayor of Flint: Dayne Walling

Federal office holders

 U.S. Senator from Michigan: Debbie Stabenow (Democrat)
 U.S. Senator from Michigan: Carl Levin (Democrat) 
 House District 1: Dan Benishek (Republican)
 House District 2: Bill Huizenga (Republican)
 House District 3: Justin Amash (Republican)
 House District 4: Dave Camp (Republican)
 House District 5: Dale Kildee (Democrat)
 House District 6: Fred Upton (Republican)
 House District 7: Tim Walberg (Republican)
 House District 8: Mike Rogers (Republican)
 House District 9: Sander Levin (Democrat)
 House District 10: Candice Miller (Republican)
 House District 11: David Curson (Democrat)
 House District 12: John Dingell (Democrat)
 House District 13: John Conyers (Democrat)
 House District 14: Gary Peters (Democrat)

Population
In the 2010 United States Census, Michigan was recorded as having a population of 9,883,640 persons, ranking as the eighth most populous state in the country.

The state's largest cities, having populations of at least 75,000 based on 2016 estimates, were as follows:

Sports

Baseball
 2013 Detroit Tigers season – Under manager Jim Leyland, the Tigers compiled a 93-69 record, finished first in the American League Central, defeated Oakland in the divisional series and lost to Boston in the American League Championship Series. The team's statistical leaders included Miguel Cabrera with a .348 batting average, 44 home runs, and 137 RBIs, Max Scherzer with 21 wins, and Joaquin Benoit with a 2.01 earned run average
 2013 Michigan Wolverines baseball team - 
 2013 Michigan Wolverines softball team -

American football
 2013 Detroit Lions season – Under coach Jim Schwartz, the Lions compiles a 7-9 record and finished third in the NFC North Division. The team's statistical leaders included Matthew Stafford with 4,650 passing yards, Reggie Bush with 1,006 rushing yards, Calvin Johnson with 1,492 receiving yards, and David Akers with 99 points scored.
 2013 Michigan State Spartans football team - Under head coach Mark Dantonio, the Spartans compiled a 13-1 record, defeated Stanford in the 2014 Rose Bowl, and were ranked No. 3 in the final AP Poll. The team's statistical leaders included Connor Cook with 2,755 passing yards, Jeremy Langford with 1,422 rushing yards and 114 points scored, and Bennie Fowler with 622 receiving yards.
 2013 Michigan Wolverines football team - Under head coach Brady Hoke, the Wolverines compiled a 7-6 record and lost to Kansas State in the Buffalo Wild Wings Bowl. The team's statistical leaders included Devin Gardner with 2,960 passing yards, Fitzgerald Toussaint with 648 rushing yards, Jeremy Gallon with 1,373 receiving yards, and Brendan Gibbons with 89 points scored.
 2013 Western Michigan Broncos football team - In their first season under head coach P. J. Fleck, the Broncos compiled a 1–11 record.
 2013 Central Michigan Chippewas football team - Under head coach Dan Enos, the Chippewas compiled a 6–6 record.
 2013 Eastern Michigan Eagles football team - Under head coaches Ron English (first 9 games) and Stan Parrish (final 3 games), the Eagles compiled a 2–10 record.

Basketball
 2012–13 Detroit Pistons season – Under coach Lawrence Frank, the Pistons compiled a 29-53 record. The team's statistical leaders included Greg Monroe with 1,298 points scored and 777 rebounds and Brandon Knight with 303 assists.
 2012–13 Michigan State Spartans men's basketball team - Under head coach Tom Izzo, the Spartans compiled a 27-9 record and lost to Duke in the Midwest Regional semifinal. The team's statistical leaders included 
 2012–13 Michigan Wolverines men's basketball team - 
 2012–13 Detroit Titans men's basketball team - Under head coach Ray McCallum, the team compiled a 20–13 record.
 2012–13 Michigan State Spartans women's basketball team - 
 2012–13 Michigan Wolverines women's basketball team -

Ice hockey
 2012–13 Detroit Red Wings season – 
 2012–13 Michigan Wolverines men's ice hockey team - In their 26th season under head coach Red Berenson, the Wolverines compiled an 18–19–3 record.
 2012–13 Michigan State Spartans men's ice hockey team - Under head coach Tom Anastos, the Spartans compiled a 17–24–3 record.

Racing
 Port Huron to Mackinac Boat Race - 
 Pure Michigan 400 - 
 Detroit Grand Prix -

Other
 Michigan Open -

Music

Chronology of events

January

February

March

April

May

June

July

August

September

October

November

December

Deaths
 January 4 - Pete Elliott, University of Michigan football player (1945–1948), at age 86 in Canton, Ohio
 March 8 - George Saimes, Michigan State football player, at age 71 in Canton, Ohio
 August 20 - Elmore Leonard, crime fiction writer, at age 87 in Bloomfield Hills
 December 10 - Don Lund, baseball player for University of Michigan and Detroit Tigers (1949, 1952–1954), at age 90 in Ann Arbor
 December 30 - Johnny Orr, Michigan basketball coach (1968–1980), at age 86 in Des Moines, Iowa

Gallery of 2013 deaths

See also
 History of Michigan
 History of Detroit

References